Do It Now may refer to:

Media
 Do It NOW, original name of the journal of the National Organization for Women

Music

Albums
Do It Now! (Clifford Coulter album), 1971
Do It Now! (Jack McDuff album), 1967
Let's Do It Now, a 1999 album by Haddaway

Songs
"Do It Now (Mashd N Kutcher song)", a 2014 song by Mashd N Kutcher
"Do It! Now", a 2002 song by Morning Musume
"Do It Now", a song by Ernest Tubb & The Texas Troubadors from the 1960 album Ernest Tubb Record Shop
"Do It Now", a 1962 song by Rusty Warren
"Do It Now", a 1963 song by Bessie Banks
"Do It Now", a song by The S.O.S. Band from the 1981 album Too
"Do It Now", a song by The Clash, B-side to "This Is England"
"Do It Now", a 1996 song by Coast
"Do It Now", a song by Mos Def from the 1999 album Black on Both Sides
"Do It Now", a song by Nebula

Films
Do It Now (film), 1924 American melodrama film directed by Duke Worne

Poems
"Do It Now", a poem by Berton Braley, c. 1915